Bernie Clifton (born Bernard M. Quinn, 30 April 1936) is a British comedian and entertainer, known for his work with his orange ostrich puppet costume Oswald the Ostrich.

Early life
Clifton was born on 30 April 1936 in St Helens, Lancashire, where he also grew up. He left grammar school without any qualifications at 15 and became an apprentice plumber. Aged 21, he was called up for national service and became a radar mechanic at the Bomber Command Bombing School (BCBS) at RAF Lindholme. He has been based in South Yorkshire ever since.

Career
Clifton's first performing job was as a singer with a dance band, but he was fired after a month. His first television performance was on the light-entertainment show The Good Old Days, where he was inspired by Les Dawson.

He performed in the 1979 Royal Variety Performance. He subsequently appeared on several further occasions, including the 2016 show.

He made regular appearances on Crackerjack!. During the 1980s, he appeared on The Keith Harris Show, and in 1982, Clifton ran the London Marathon with Oswald the Ostrich.

In 2002, Clifton featured on the BBC Two documentary series The Entertainers, which followed 1970s and '80s entertainers who had dropped out of the limelight. In 2005, Clifton and Oswald appeared in Peter Kay's and Tony Christie's music video for  the Comic Relief charity re-release of "(Is This the Way to) Amarillo".

In 2005, Clifton appeared as himself in an episode of the David Renwick sitcom Love Soup having previously been mentioned by Renwick in an early episode of One Foot in the Grave.

He made his Edinburgh Festival Fringe debut in 2006 at the Udderbelly venue. Writing in The Guardian, Brian Logan gave it 3 out of 5 stars and called it an "exercise in retro comedy", but "also unrepentantly funny".

Clifton was a contestant on Series 5 of The Voice UK, applying under his birth name. He performed "The Impossible Dream (The Quest)" from Man of La Mancha, and did not advance past the blind auditions. Following his appearance on the show he released an album of covers called The Impossible Dream, which included "The Lady in Red" and "Wind Beneath My Wings". After a death metal band's song titles were printed on his album cover by mistake, Clifton presented an award at the Kerrang! Awards in June 2016.

In 2018, he starred in ITV's Last Laugh in Vegas, a documentary following eight "showbiz legends" as they prepared a show in Las Vegas.

In January 2020, Clifton appeared as a guest on the first episode of the new series of Crackerjack! on CBBC. In February that year, he played himself in the first episode of Meet The Richardsons on Dave. Within the episode, he is a family friend of Jon Richardson and teaches him how to operate a monkey puppet similar to his ostrich.

Clifton has starred in several pantomimes, playing the father of Cinderella at the Hull New Theatre in 2018 and at Northampton's Royal & Derngate in 2019. He has also presented shows on BBC Radio Sheffield, and BBC Radio 4.
In 2018, Inside No. 9 titled an episode Bernie Clifton's Dressing Room.
On 10 March 2022, he made an unplanned telephone appearance on the Chris Moyles Show on Radio X, having been referenced by comedian, Jon Richardson, who appeared on the radio show earlier that morning.

Personal life
In 1961 Clifton married Marjorie Hancock. They went on to have four children together. Clifton was widowed on 9 September 2000.

Filmography

References

External links

Bernie Clifton at the British Film Institute
Bernie Clifton (Aveleyman)
Website

1936 births
Living people
20th-century British comedians
21st-century British comedians
20th-century Royal Air Force personnel
Comedians from Lancashire
People from St Helens, Merseyside